Bunnak Phatthana is a village and tambon (subdistrict) of Mueang Lampang District, in Lampang Province, Thailand. In 2005 it had a population of 5,165. The tambon contains 11 villages.

References

Tambon of Lampang province
Populated places in Lampang province